Parot is a surname. Notable people with the surname include:

 Alfonso Parot (born 1989), Chilean footballer
 Carmen Luz Parot (born 1967), Chilean journalist and documentary filmmaker
 Catalina Parot (born 1956), Chilean lawyer and politician
 Henri Parot (born 1958), Spanish murderer
 Hubert Parot (1933–2015), French equestrian
 Jean-François Parot (born 1946), French diplomat and writer
 Samuel Parot (born 1964), Chilean equestrian

See also
 Parot, Spanish television series
 Parot doctrine, Spanish legal doctrine
 Parrot (disambiguation)